Ara Topouzian (born in 1969) is an Armenian musician who began playing Armenian and Middle Eastern music in 1991. He plays the kanon.

Biography
In 1991, he formed American Recording Productions (ARP) with the intent to record and preserve this type of world music. This record label has produced over thirty recordings of Armenian and Middle Eastern music, including one of Topouzian's albums, Live from Detroit.

In 2012, Topouzian was awarded the Kresge Artist Fellowship. He was among 24 literary and performing artists who received the 2012 Kresge Artist Fellowships, which provide support metro Detroit artists. He was also invited to the Virginia Commonwealth University Symphony, performing a composition written for the Kanun by VCU Music Professor and Composer Doug Richards entitled "Ben Seni Variations.".

In 2013, Topouzian received a grant from the John S. and James L. Knight Foundation to produce a documentary on the history of Armenian music and the musicians from Detroit, Michigan.

On March 16, 2015, Topouzian released a film documentary on Detroit Public Television entitled Guardians of Music: A History of Armenian Music in Detroit.

On March 27, 2015, Iit was announced that Topouzian was the 2015 Artist in Residence in Farmington Hills, Michigan. This is an award given each year to a resident of Farmington or Farmington Hills, Michigan who displays exceptional talent and artistic accomplishments. Topouzian performed a concert of Armenian music with proceeds benefiting the City of Farmington Hills Cultural Arts Division that honored him with the Artist in Residence award on January 23, 2016.

Other Performances
In 2014, Topouzian joined the Mark Gavoor Ensemble to perform a concert of Armenian folk music in Walla Walla, Washington for Whitman College.

HOUR Media featured a story about Ara Topouzian.

Discography
 Live from Detroit: Ara Topouzian Ensemble
  Khnjook!
 Stringed Tranquility
 Faces of Bravery 
 Whispers of Ellis Island
 Harmonic Classics 
 Eastern Winds
 Full Circle
 For The Children of Armenia
 Near Eastern Ride
 Cafe' Makam
 Zamperla 
 In Transit
 A Miracle of Birds (2012) with Joshua Davis
 Homage: Ara Topouzian Quartet (2015)

Film documentaries
(Music from Ara Topouzian is used)
 The Armenian Americans (2000)
 The Armenians, Story of Survival (2001)
 The Lighthouse (2001)
 Mountain Men and Holy Wars (2002) 
 Images of the Armenian Spirit (2003) 
 The Armenian Genocide (2006)
 Orphans of the Genocide (2014)
 Guardians of Music: A History of Armenian Music in Detroit (2015)

Educational films
World Music: A Cultural Legacy (2000) 
Published by Glencow Division, McGraw Hill/Macmillan Press 
An educational audio package in teaching students the different forms of world music. Music from Khnjook! The Ara Topouzian Ensemble was utilized for this project.

Our Musical World: The Middle East & North Africa (2012) 
Each Unit includes: broad discussions of under-emphasized topics in Western education; stories and interviews from the musicians, educators, or youth of the culture-groups discussed, and wonderfully creative musical samples. Our Musical World, (5.1 Book 5 / Video 1 ) -- looks at the culture and music of Armenia. Ara Topouzian - narrates & demonstrates the Kanun and Armenian music—which evolved over grave injustices imposed by the former Ottoman Empire.

Non-profit organizations
Topouzian also serves on the Board of Directors for the Michigan Economic Developers Association. In 2014, he began his second term and as chairman of the organization.

In 2014, Topouzian joined the Board of Directors of Creative Many (formerly Artserve)

In 2013, Topouzian left the City of Novi as their economic development director and was appointed CEO of the Troy Chamber of Commerce.

In 2017, Topouzian was appointed by State of Michigan Governor Rick Snyder to Michigan Council of Arts and Cultural Affairs.

Awards
In 2013, Topouzian received the Mike Conboy Professional Development Award for outstanding contribution to Michigan Economic Developers Association.

In 2015, Topouzian received the 2015 Overall Winner Diversity Business Leader Award from Corp! magazine for recognition of outstanding leadership in diversity and multiculturalism in the State of Michigan.

In 2016 and 2017, Topouzian received the Best of Detroit from HOUR magazine under the category of Best Local Band (Original Music)  

In 2015, Topouzian was awarded second place for Vote 4 The Best sponsored by WDIV Television. 

In 2015, Topouzian was awarded Artist in Residence by the City of Farmington Hills, Michigan 

In 2022, Topouzian was awarded a Michigan Heritage Award from the Michigan Traditional Arts Program through Michigan State University. http://traditionalarts.msu.edu/2022-michigan-heritage-awardees-announced/

References

External links
 Official Website for Ara Topouzian
 American Recording Productions, record label carrying titles of Ara Topouzian
 HYE Times (Blog by Ara Topouzian)
 Troy Chamber of Commerce

1969 births
Living people
Armenian musicians
Soviet emigrants to the United States